Chengdu Tram Line 2 is a tram line in Chengdu, China. It has a 'Y' layout and runs from the Chengdu West railway station to Pixian West railway station and Hongguang. The line was officially started in December 2015, and the  demonstration section of the line was opened on 26 December 2018, and the remaining sections were opened on 27 December 2019.

History

In 2014, Chengdu disclosed the concept of building a modern tram system in the first and second round of rail transit planning. The construction concept of Chengdu Modern Tram System was disclosed in 2014. In September 2015, Chengdu Development and Reform Commission formally issued an agreement to Chengdu IT Avenue Modern Tram with the document "Chengfa Reform Government Approval [2015] No. 216". Route 2 line approval, the same month, the Chengdu Municipal government announced the "urban rail transit network construction to speed up the implementation of the program."

The line started the preliminary construction in December 2015. On 15 April 2016, the proposed naming of the 47 stations on the Chengdu route 2 entered the publicity stage and was approved by the Chengdu Municipal Government in July of the same year. In September 2016, the entire line started construction and the line demonstration site Baiye Road Station was completed in December. In June 2017, Chengdu CRRC Long Passenger Rail Vehicle Company announced the low-floor tram vehicles used on the line. On 25 September of the same year, the first section of the line achieved long-track rail connection, and it was announced that it would open in the first half of 2018.

On 25 January 2018, the first section of the line was energized by the contact network; on August 10, the line completed the "hot slip" test; on September 6, the line was handed over to the operating unit; on September 10, the line started the EMU commissioning work; At the beginning of December, the installation of traffic safety signs for the first opening section was completed. On 26 December 2018, the first section opened for trial operation. On 26 December 2019, the non-initial segment opened.

Timeline

2014 - Construction of a tram network was decided.
2016 - Officially construction was started.
2018 - Commercial service was opened in 26 December.
2019 - Pixian West Railway Station - Chenguang, Hexin Road - Chengdu West Railway Station and branch route opened in 27 December.

Tram route

 T2 - Chengdu West railway station to Pixian West railway station via Xinye Road
 T2 branch - Xinye Road to Renhe

Practical Info

 Total length - .
 Opened - 26 Dec. 2018 (initial); 27 Dec. 2019 (full)
 Number of Stops - 35
 Number of routes - 2
 Gauge - Standard Gauge

The main line of Chengdu Tram Line T2 runs from 07:00-20:40 (to Chengdu West railway station) / 07:00-21:00 (to Pixian West railway station), and the branch line runs from 07:00-20:50 (to Xinye Road)/07:00-21:30 (toward Chenguang), the departure interval is about 10 minutes, and the whole journey takes about 40 minutes.

Fleet

The Chengdu Tram Line 2 train has three colors of blue-green, light blue and bright yellow. The tram has 64 seats, a capacity of 300 people, and a maximum passenger capacity of 380 people. The car is equipped with barrier-free facilities and a button to open the door.

Theme tram

When the Chengdu route 2 was fully opened in 2019, a theme tram with the theme of "National Security Archives" went online simultaneously. The painting of the tram is based on the theme of spring, summer, autumn and winter, and nine nationally protected animals are interspersed in the form of illustrations, and corresponding science content is set in the car, calling on citizens to pay attention to and participate in the protection of endangered wild animals.

Depots & termini

Termini are Chengdu West railway station, Pixian West railway station & Renhe.

Alignment and Interchanges

Chengdu Tram Line 2 leads from Chengdu West Railway Station, heading northwest to Xinye Road Station, and then along two lines to Pixian West railway station and Renhe. In addition, in 2018, the newly planned Honggao branch line of Chengdu Line 2 leads from Hezuo Road Station to Jintu Station, connecting the Xipi section and the Xinhong section, making the whole line a ring.

The platform of Chengdu Tram Line 2 is open, and passengers must purchase tickets or swipe cards on the train. The platforms of the first section are all side platforms, and are equipped with half-height screen doors (not in use), seats and train information display screens. The platforms on both sides are not symmetrical and do not communicate directly. For the sake of cost saving and easy maintenance, the subsequent stations did not install half-height screen doors, and replaced the tempered glass railings with wire mesh materials.
 
Transfer at Chengdu West Railway Station: Chengdu Metro Line 4; Chengpu Line of the China High Speed Railway
Transfer at Tianhe Road station: Chengdu Metro Line 2 (Tianhe Road station)
Transfer at Longyin station: Chengdu Metro Line 6 (Zitonggong station)
Transfer at Wangcong Temple station: Chengdu Metro Line 6 (Wangcong Temple station)

Tickets

The fare of the line is two yuan for the whole journey, which is paid by cash or Tianfutong, and supports Tianfutong, Cloud QuickPass or the application of two-dimensional code scanning in Chengdu Metro.

See also
Line 1 (Chengdu Tram)
Chengdu Metro
Trams in China

References

Transport in Chengdu
Railway lines opened in 2018
Chengdu
2018 establishments in China